"Chauharmal" or  "Chuharmal" or "Veer Chauharmal" was a folk hero who was later apotheosized by the members of Dusadh caste. The story of Chauharmal within Dusadh folklore is an empowering message which gives the Dalit community a sense of victory over upper caste Bhumihars.

In popular culture
Chauharmal was born in Anjani village, which is located in Patna district. He is described as a devotee of Goddess Durga.

In the folklores of Bihar, various stories of Chauharmal exist. Some of these stories consider him a folk hero of Dusadh community, while other degrade him as an anti-hero. According to the most popular variant, Baba Chauharmal was a chivalrous man of Dusadh caste who used to study along with his Bhumihar friend, Ajab Singh. The father of Ajab Singh was a powerful landlord named Ranjit Singh and his sister was Reshma, who had fallen in one sided love with the Chauharmal who considered her as his sister. Annoyed by the attitude of Chauharmal, Reshma sends an army of his father to defeat Chauharmal and demoralise him. But, Dusadhs performed Rahu Puja and Chauharmal escaped due to the grace of Isht devi (folk goddess) of the Dusadh caste while Reshma was burnt into ashes.

According to another version of the story Chauharmal and Reshma were lovers but their relationship was not supported by her father, who was a powerful landlord of the Bhumihar caste. In order to defeat and assassinate the person who was responsible for letting him down, the father of Reshma sent an army. Chauharmal, who was known for his valour, defeated all of them single-handedly and later assumed "Samadhi"(meditation) to give up his life himself. Thus, he became popular as a symbol of Dusadh's victory over the landlord Bhumihars.

Reshma is often described in the plays in an abusing and insulting language, highlighting her as a sexual and immoral person. There is a view that lower castes take a vicarious revenge on the Upper castes through this subversion.

The Dusadhs of Mithila region however recognise Sahlesh as their hero, who is said to be uncle of Chauharmal. Sahles was able to take a job as a palace guard ("Mahapour") in the fort of "King of Morang".Chauharmal himself wanted that job and felt cheated. He decided to take revenge but was killed by Sahles. Thus, according to this tradition Sahles is the primary hero while Chauharmal is given secondary status.

The Dalit community also praises Chauharmal and Sahles through various folk songs usually sung in the Bhojpuri language . One of the notable folk song sung in the praise of Chauharmal after Reshma's introduction in his life goes as follows :

Commemoration
The Dusadh celebrate numerous festivals associated with the Chauharmal; the biggest among these being famous "Chauharmal Mela", celebrated near Patna. According to Vijay Nambisan, the Dausadh of the region participate with pomp and show in the famous mela to commemorate the popular saint (Chauharmal) who not only fled with an "upper caste" girl but also vanquished all her kin. The centre of attraction in this festival remains the participation of Lalu Prasad Yadav. Earlier, such an incident received violent reaction from the Bhumihars but Yadav's participation makes it a rallying point for Dalits.

The celebrations had witnessed violent clashes between the upper and the lower castes in past, the most infamous being the "Ekauni incident".The Dalits however organise theatrical performances like "Rani Reshma ka khela" to commemorate the whole life of Chauharmal in which various stages of his life are performed by the trained artists. The ritual head of Dusadhs, the Bhagat performs rituals during such occasions.

See also
Bijli Pasi

References

Indian folk culture
Caste system in India
Indian folklore